Howard Cutler may refer to:

Howard C. Cutler, American writer and psychiatrist
Howard Wright Cutler (1883–1948), American architect